The ATP Challenger Tour was the secondary professional tennis circuit organized by the Association of Tennis Professionals (ATP). The 2011 ATP Challenger Tour calendar comprised 15 top tier Tretorn SERIE+ tournaments, and approximately 150 regular series tournaments, with prize money ranging from $35,000 up to $150,000.

Schedule
This is the schedule of events, with player progression documented from the quarterfinals stage.

Key

January

February

March

April

May

June

July

August

September

October

November

Statistical information
These tables present the number of singles (S) and doubles (D) titles won by each player and each nation during the season, within all the tournament categories of the 2011 ATP Challenger Tour: the Tretorn SERIE+ tournaments, and the regular series tournaments. The players/nations are sorted by: 1) total number of titles (a doubles title won by two players representing the same nation counts as only one win for the nation); 2) cumulated importance of those titles (one Tretorn SERIE+ win > one regular tournament win); 3) a singles > doubles hierarchy; 4) alphabetical order (by family names for players).

To avoid confusion and double counting, these tables should be updated only after an event is completed.

Titles won by player

Titles won by nation

ATP Year-To-Date Challenger Rankings

Point Distribution
Points are awarded as follows:

References

External links
 Association of Tennis Professionals (ATP) World Tour official website
 International Tennis Federation (ITF) official website

 
ATP Challenger Tour
ATP Challenger Tour